Bythaelurus is a genus of deep-water catsharks and part of the family Scyliorhinidae. The genus Bythaelurus Compagno 1988 was first described as a subgenus of Halaelurus Gill 1862 based on several morphological characteristics including a soft body with thin skin, a bluntly rounded snout without a pointed, knob-like tip, and eyes not noticeably elevated on the dorsal surface of the head. Members of this genus are generally found in deep water and have more somber body coloration.

Species
There are currently 14 recognized species in this genus:
 Bythaelurus alcockii (Garman, 1913) (Arabian catshark)
 Bythaelurus bachi Weigmann et al., 2016 (Bach's catshark)
 Bythaelurus canescens (Günther, 1878) (dusky catshark)
 Bythaelurus clevai (Séret, 1987) (broadhead catshark)
 Bythaelurus dawsoni (S. Springer, 1971) (New Zealand catshark)
 Bythaelurus giddingsi J. E. McCosker, Long & C. C. Baldwin, 2012 (Galápagos catshark)
 Bythaelurus hispidus (Alcock, 1891) (bristly catshark)
 Bythaelurus immaculatus (Y. T. Chu & Q. W. Meng, 1982) (spotless catshark)
 Bythaelurus incanus Last & J. D. Stevens, 2008 (sombre catshark)
 Bythaelurus lutarius (S. Springer & D'Aubrey, 1972) (mud catshark)
 Bythaelurus naylori Ebert & Clerkin, 2015 (dusky snout catshark)
 Bythaelurus stewarti Weigmann, Kaschner, and Thiel, 2018 (Error Seamount catshark)
 Bythaelurus tenuicephalus Kaschner, Weigmann & Thiel, 2015 (narrowhead catshark) 
 Bythaelurus vivaldii  (Vivaldi's catshark)

References

 
Shark genera
Taxa named by Leonard Compagno
Taxonomy articles created by Polbot